Paul Ogata is an American stand-up comedian and actor.

Personal life
Ogata was born and raised in Pearl City, Hawaii, and moved to Los Angeles in 2006 to devote more time to performing stand-up comedy.

Ogata graduated from the University of Hawaii. In college, he briefly studied Electrical Engineering, a field for which he showed some aptitude as a teen. (Ogata wrote a video game at the age of 13.)

Career
Paul Ogata worked for years as a top-rated morning radio personality in Honolulu on KDDB-FM.

He has appeared on several television shows, most notably Live at Gotham on Comedy Central, the syndicated Comics Unleashed and CBS's Late Late Show.

Ogata is a comedian. In 2004, he was victorious in the TakeOut Comedy Competition, earning the title of "Funniest Asian-American Comedian in the U.S." In 2007, Ogata won the prestigious San Francisco International Comedy Competition, joining a list of previous winners which include Dana Carvey, Sinbad and Jake Johannsen.

Paul Ogata also appeared in the Damon Wayans motion picture Behind The Smile, and starred in the short film Amazing Asian.

On February 23, 2010, Ogata's debut stand-up comedy album, "Paul Ogata Stands Up: Live in Hong Kong", was released on the New Wave Dynamics label.

Filmography

Movies
"Porndogs: The Adventures of Sadie" (2009) as Master Dong
Behind The Smile (2006) as Karate Man
Amazing Asian (2004) as The Amazing Asian

Television
Celebrity Family Feud, ABC (self)
Comedy Central Stand Up, Asia!, Comedy Central Asia (featured comedian)
Pacific Rim Comedy, Showtime (featured comedian)
Comics Unleashed, Syndicated (featured comedian)
Live at Gotham, Comedy Central (featured comedian)
Late Late Show, CBS (featured comedian)
Asia Street Comedy',' AZN Television (featured comedian)New Year's Comedy Cure, TBS (featured comedian)Friday Night'', NBC (featured comedian)

Discography
"Paul Ogata Stands Up: Live in Hong Kong" (2010) New Wave Dynamics

References

External links
 
 Paul Ogata's page at Comedy Central's website

American stand-up comedians
Living people
Male actors from Hawaii
University of Hawaiʻi at Mānoa alumni
1968 births
American male actors of Japanese descent
20th-century American comedians
21st-century American comedians